Fabio Diotallevi is an Italian film producer and production manager.

He produced along Mino Loy and Luciano Martino Tutti i Colori del Buio (1972), directed by Sergio Martino. He also produced Hercules (1983), The Adventures of Hercules II (1985), Hit Squad (1976), and Vacanze per un massacro (1980).

Filmography

References

Bibliography

External links
 

Year of birth missing (living people)
Italian film producers
Living people